Mrouj (also spelled Mrouje and El Mrouj) is a municipality in the Matn District of the Mount Lebanon Governorate of Lebanon. The English translation of Mrouj is "The Meadows"

Location
Mrouj is one of the Lebanese villages of the Metn district in Mount Lebanon. Mrouj overlooks Mount Sannine, Beskenta and Kesrouan to the north, and Metn south to the south.
 
Elevation is 1,220 meters above sea level and is about 32 km from the capital Beirut. It is surrounded by a group of neighboring villages, the most important  Bologna, wata El Muroj, El Mtein, Marjaba, and Al-Zaarour ski resort 6 kilometers north of Mrouj. 

St. Takla is a saint which the village celebrates on September 24 of each year, the celebrations begin a week before and end after at least one week. The village also promotes summer vacations to escape the heat and oppressive humidities of coastal cities.

Water 
Lake Mrouj is located approximately 3 km north of the town. It is a source of water for many villages in the Matn District

Economy 
Mrouj is mostly a destination for summer tourism for Beirutis in the summer and ski enthusiasts in the winter. Zaarour ski resorts are about 6 km north of Mrouj

The town also hosts an annual festival for St. Takla in September in the St. Takla Square in the center of Mrouj

Education 
There is a private [Catholic] school in the town. (Saint cœur Mrouj)

Religion 
The inhabitants of Mrouj are almost all Christians, predominantly Maronites

St Takla Church was built approx in 1792

Churches 

 Evangelical Church.
 St. Takla – Maronite.

References

External links 
Mrouj,  Localiban
 Google Satellite Picture of Mrouje

Populated places in the Matn District
Maronite Christian communities in Lebanon